A. C. Shanmugam is the founder and president of the New Justice Party, a political party of Tamil Nadu, India.

A C Shanmugam was born in a Tuluva Vellala (Agamudaya Mudaliar) family. He began his political career as an All India Anna Dravida Munnetra Kazhagam (AIADMK) politician, when in 1984, he won the Parliament Election with 52.93% of votes for AIADMK. Subsequently, he held the posts of MP and Member of the Legislative Assembly, before founding the New Justice Party. In 2014, as a BJP candidate, he came runner-up when he contested elections in Vellore Lok Sabha. Later, he returned to AIADMK.

He stood from the Vellore Lok Sabha constituency in 2019 on a Pudhiya Needhi Katchi ticket. He is also the founder and chancellor of Dr. M.G.R. Educational and Research Institute, Rajarajeswari Group of Institutions, and ACS group of institutions in Arani. He works for the upliftment of Mudaliyars. He is ardent fan of M. G. Ramachandran. Er. A.C.S. Arunkumar, son of Dr. Shanmugam is the youngest Pro Chancellor of the Deemed University. Life Member - Indian Society for Technical Education

Needhi Katchi
Needhi Katchi, formerly Puthiya Needhi Katchi (translation: New Justice Party), is a political party in Tamil Nadu, headed by A.C. Shanmugam, a former AIADMK member. The party was started just before the 2001 Tamil Nadu assembly election. The leader of the party claims to represent Mudaliars and Pillaimars castes significantly present from all over Tamilnadu. In September 2009, the party renamed itself as Needhi Katchi by dropping the pudhiya (lit. new) prefix.

As of 2022, the party is still led by A. C. Shanmugam, and continues to ally with larger parties.

References

Further reading
The Hindu - Floral tributes paid to MGR

Year of birth missing (living people)
Living people
All India Anna Dravida Munnetra Kazhagam politicians
India MPs 1984–1989
Lok Sabha members from Tamil Nadu
National Democratic Alliance candidates in the 2014 Indian general election
People from Vellore district
Political parties in Tamil Nadu